Tyson Meek (born 21 April 1980 in the United States) was a United States rugby union player. His playing position was scrum-half. He was selected as a reserve for the United States at the 2007 Rugby World Cup, but did not make an appearance. He though made 4 appearances for the United States during 2006.

Reference list

1980 births
United States international rugby union players
Living people
Rugby union scrum-halves
Sportspeople from Plano, Texas